Lancaster may refer to:

Lands and titles 
The County Palatine of Lancaster, a synonym for Lancashire
Duchy of Lancaster, one of only two British royal duchies
Duke of Lancaster
Earl of Lancaster
House of Lancaster, a British royal dynasty

Places

Australia
Lancaster, Victoria

Canada
Lancaster, New Brunswick
Lancaster, Newfoundland and Labrador
Lancaster, Ontario
Lancaster, St. Catharines, Ontario
Lancaster Sound, Nunavut

United Kingdom 
Lancaster, Lancashire, the original Lancaster from which other place names are derived
Lancaster University
Lancaster (UK Parliament constituency), a historical political district
Lancaster and Wyre (UK Parliament constituency), the modern political district
City of Lancaster, a non-metropolitan local government district based in Lancaster, formed in 1974
Lancaster Rural District, a former local government area abolished in 1974
Municipal Borough of Lancaster, a former local government area abolished in 1974
Lancaster House, London

United States
Lancaster, Arkansas, a ghost town
Lancaster, California, the largest "Lancaster" in the world by population 
Lancaster, Illinois
Lancaster, Huntington County, Indiana
Lancaster, Jefferson County, Indiana
Patricksburg, Indiana, a community also called Lancaster
Lancaster, Kansas
Lancaster, Kentucky
Lancaster, Massachusetts
Lancaster, Minnesota
Lancaster, Missouri
Lincoln, Nebraska (once known as Lancaster)
Lancaster, New Hampshire, a New England town
Lancaster (CDP), New Hampshire, village within the town
Lancaster, New York, a town
Lancaster (village), New York, within the town of Lancaster
Lancaster, Ohio
Lancaster, Oregon
Lancaster, Pennsylvania, the oldest inland city and one-time capital of the United States
Lancaster, South Carolina
Lancaster, Tennessee
Lancaster, Texas
Lancaster, Virginia
Lancaster, Wisconsin, a city
Lancaster Junction, Wisconsin, an unincorporated community
Lancaster County, Nebraska
Lancaster County, Pennsylvania
Lancaster Valley AVA, Pennsylvanian wine region
Lancaster County, South Carolina
Lancaster County, Virginia
Lancaster Township, Pennsylvania (disambiguation), multiple locations

Companies and products
Companies
 Lancaster Group, a cosmetics company founded in Monaco in 1946, now part of Coty, Inc.
 Lancaster Leaf Tobacco Company, an American subsidiary of Universal Corporation
 J. Lancaster & Son, Birmingham, one of the world's major camera makers in 1898, held several shutter patents
Products
 Lancaster, the codename for AMD Turion 64 processor for notebook computers
 Armstrong Siddeley Lancaster, a British car produced between 1945 and 1952
 Subaru Legacy Lancaster, the Japanese name for the Subaru Outback sold from 1998 to 2004

Military
Avro Lancaster, the World War II-era bomber aircraft
Duke of Lancaster's Regiment, British Army unit
HMS Lancaster, six ships of the Royal Navy, 1694 to the present
USS Lancaster, four ships of the United States Navy, 1858 to 1945
Lancaster pistol, a multi-barreled handgun

Sports
Lancaster Barnstormers, a minor-league baseball team of the Atlantic League
Lancaster City F.C., an English football club based in Lancaster, Lancashire
Lancaster Cricket Club, English cricket club
Lancaster Football Club, Australian Rules Football team based in Lancaster, Australia
Lancaster JetHawks, a minor-league baseball team of the California League
Lancaster Park, a cricket and rugby ground in Christchurch, New Zealand
Lancaster Rattlers, American soccer team
Lancaster Red Roses, former minor-league baseball team

Other
 Lancaster (surname), people with the surname Lancaster
 Lancaster's or Lancaster Disease; alternative names for Treacher Collins syndrome
 Lancaster station (disambiguation), stations of the name

See also 

House of Lancaster
Lanchester (disambiguation)